Tan is a pale tone of brown. The name is derived from tannum (oak bark) used in the tanning of leather.

The first recorded use of tan as a color name in English was in the year 1590.

Colors which are similar or may be considered synonymous to tan include: tawny, tenné, and fulvous.


Variations of tan

Sandy tan

Displayed at right is the color Sandy tan.

This color was formulated by Crayola in 2000 as a Crayola marker color.

Tan (Crayola)

Displayed at right is the orangish tone of tan called tan since 1958 in Crayola crayons and 1990 in Crayola markers.

Windsor tan

Displayed at right is the color Windsor tan.

The first recorded use of Windsor tan as a color name in English was in 1925.

Tuscan tan

Displayed at right is the color Tuscan tan.

The first recorded use of Tuscan tan as a color name in English was in 1926.

The normalized color coordinates for Tuscan tan are identical to café au lait and French beige, which were first recorded as color names in English in 1839 and 1927, respectively.

In human culture 
Military
 Tan is the color of the United States Army Rangers beret as well as Canada's Canadian Special Operations Regiment and Joint Task Force 2.

Sunbathing
 When a person sunbathes to make their skin darker, they are said to be getting a tan.

See also 
 Lists of colors
 Buff, a similar color
 Khaki, another similar color

References

Shades of brown